This is a list of weapons used by the Finnish Army, for past equipment, see here.For equipment or ships of the Finnish Navy, see List of equipment of the Finnish Navy and List of active Finnish Navy ships; for Finnish Air Force aircraft, see List of military aircraft of Finland.

Armour and other vehicles

Main battle tanks

Infantry fighting vehicles

Armoured personnel carriers (tracked)

Armoured personnel carriers (wheeled)

Utility vehicles

All-terrain vehicles

Military engineering vehicles

Field artillery

Towed field guns and howitzers

Self-propelled artillery

Multiple rocket launcher systems

Forward observer vehicles

Radars

Anti-aircraft systems

Surface-to-air missile systems

Anti-aircraft artillery

Trucks

Infantry weapons

Pistols

Assault rifles

Battle rifles

Shotguns

Sniper rifles

Submachine guns

Support weapons

Mortars

Anti-armour

Land mines

Hand grenades

Army aviation 
The NHIndustries NH90 tactical transport helicopter is the main type of transport helicopter used, having replaced Soviet Mi-8s. The Army also uses Hughes 500 D and E helicopters in reconnaissance and training roles. The Finnish Army has 11 unmanned reconnaissance airplanes (RUAG Ranger), which are used for reconnaissance and artillery targeting purposes, and in 2012 ordered a number of unmanned Aeronautics Defense Orbiters.

See also 
 List of former equipment of the Finnish Army

References

External links
 
Vienna 2011 Annual Exchange of Military Information: 2023 (archive), 2022 (archive), 2021 (archive), 2020 (archive), 2019 (archive), 2018 (archive), 2017 (archive), 2016 (archive), 2015 (archive).

Military equipment of Finland
Finnish Army
Finnish military-related lists